Galeries de la Capitale is a shopping mall located in the Lebourgneuf neighbourhood of the Les Rivières borough in Quebec City, Quebec, Canada.

Les Galeries de la Capitale has 280 stores and 35 restaurants. The anchors are La Baie d'Hudson, Simons, Atmosphère/Sports Experts, Toys "R" Us, IMAX, Best Buy. There is also a Rona l'Entrepôt in the parking lot. The mall is famous for its indoor amusement park, le Mega-Parc, with 18 attractions and amusement rides including the first spokeless Ferris wheel in America. The IMAX theatre has the largest screen in Canada.

It is also the infrastructure in Quebec City with the highest tax value at $320 million in 2007. With 11 million visitors annually, Galeries de la Capitale ranked in 2012 as the second most visited shopping mall in Quebec City after Laurier Québec and the fourth in the province as a whole.

History
Les Galeries de la Capitale was the idea of businessman Marcel Adams. At the time the mall was owned at 50% by Les Développements Iberville (the real estate company of Marcel Adams), at 25% by Eaton Properties (the real estate company of Eaton's), and at 25% by Markborough Properties (the real estate company of the Hudson's Bay Company). Upon its opening of 190 stores, the anchors were Eaton, La Baie, Provigo, Cooprix, Simons which were joined in the fall of the same year by Woolco. This also marked the opening of the first La Baie store in Quebec City. Not even a year after its inauguration, Cooprix at Galeries de la Capitale permanently closed on May 26, 1982.

1988 saw the opening of the indoor amusement park Mega-Parc, the second largest of its kind in Canada after West Edmonton Mall. The park, composed of 20 amusement rides,  included a Ferris wheel, some roller coasters and a skating rink for ice hockey games. That same year, the first annual Opération Enfant Soleil telethon was broadcast from les Galeries de la Capitale and raised $1.8 million for the Centre Hospitalier de l'Université Laval (CHUL).

Due to a lack of profitability from this particular store since its inception, Provigo decided to reduced its space and subleased the vacant part to toy retailer Toyville which opened on October 1, 1987. Toyville closed on December 29, 1990 and Provigo in May 1992.

Woolco was converted to Wal-Mart in 1994 as part of the American parent company's entrance to Canada. In early 2002, Wal-Mart left Galeries de la Capitale to relocate on the nearby parking, allowing its former space in the mall to be replaced on July 13 of the same year by rival Zellers, itself relocating from a previous address in the Neufchâtel neighborhood.

Eaton went bankrupt in 1999 and its location at Galeries de la Capitale was the sole store in the province that Sears Canada had acquired. The store was converted into the Sears banner without ever closing down.

The mall was sold on December 1, 2005 for $358 million to a consortium consisting of Canada Pension Plan (80%); Osmington, an investment firm in Toronto (10%); and Westerkirk, a Toronto real estate firm (10%). Redcliff Realty Management was hired to manage the mall. Since June 4, 2013, Galeries de la Capitale is owned and operated by Oxford Properties.

In Spring 2011, Galeries de la Capitale opened a new section of the mall. The new section was added between the upper level McDonald's and the IMAX theatre. The new section included Best Buy's first Quebec City location, a Sports Experts store, and a new Toys "R" Us (the latter opening before the others in November 2010).

Zellers (formerly Woolco/Wal-Mart) closed in February 2013 and was replaced by Target from 2013 until early 2015 when it ceased all retail operations across Canada. Simons doubled its size to 80,000 square feet by relocating to the vacant Target in 2017.

In 2017, Sears Canada announced they would be closing all their remaining stores. This includes the store at Galeries de la Capitale.

After almost 30 years in operation, the Mega-Parc closed on September 4, 2017 to undergo major renovations. It reopened on January 18, 2019 with 18 amusement rides; 14 of which are new. The 4 returning rides from the original Mega-Parc have all been renovated and renamed. Particular to the new Mega-Parc is Zénith, the first Ferris wheel in the continent without spokes.

See also
List of largest enclosed shopping malls in Canada
Fleur de Lys centre commercial
Laurier Québec
Place Sainte-Foy

References

External links
Official website

1981 establishments in Quebec
Buildings and structures completed in 1981
Eaton's
Shopping malls established in 1981
Shopping malls in Quebec City